SFU Stadium at Terry Fox Field is a multi-purpose sport field on Burnaby Mountain in Burnaby, British Columbia. It serves as the home field of the Simon Fraser University Red Leafs for association football, Canadian football (before 2010 season) and American football (from 2010 season onward) matches. The Red Leafs men's lacrosse club also plays their home matches on Terry Fox Field, and Simon Fraser University's Department of Recreation and Athletics regularly hosts sport camps on Terry Fox Field.

Naming

The field is named after Terry Fox, who was once a student of Simon Fraser University and played for SFU's junior varsity basketball team.

Facility information

As a multi-purpose field, there are overlapping permanent markings for American football, soccer and lacrosse on Terry Fox Field. In order to accommodate the university's transition from CIS (playing Canadian football) to the NCAA (playing American football), Terry Fox Field was re-turfed in 2011, with markings for a Canadian football field replaced with markings for an American football field.

Terry Fox Field's tracks are classified as an IAAF Standard Track with a water jump hurdle outside the bend. West to the field itself is a long jump facility built according to IAAF standards.

Terry Fox Field had been one of the few varsity stadiums in Canada without permanent seating. However in 2021, a permanent grandstand with seating for 1,823 spectators (and room for 1,000 temporary bleachers which can be added when needed), was added. With the completion of the permanent stands, the venue's name was changed to SFU Stadium at Terry Fox Field.

References

See also 

 Thunderbird Stadium
 Swangard Stadium

Sports venues in British Columbia
Terry Fox
Simon Fraser Red Leafs
Soccer venues in British Columbia
American football venues in Canada
Canadian football venues in British Columbia
Lacrosse venues
University sports venues in Canada